is a 2011 Japanese drama film directed by Hajime Hashimoto and based on a novel by Naomi Azuma.

Cast
 Yo Oizumi as the detective
 Ryuhei Matsuda as Takada
 Koyuki as Saori
 Toshiyuki Nishida as Toshio Kirishima
 Tomorowo Taguchi as Matsuo
 Yutaka Matsushige
 Masanobu Takashima
 Renji Ishibashi
 Mayumi Shintani
 Keiko Takeshita

Sequels
Detective in the Bar 2 (2013)
The Last Shot in the Bar (2017)

References

External links
  
 

2011 films
2011 drama films
Japanese drama films
2010s Japanese-language films
Films based on Japanese novels
Films directed by Hajime Hashimoto
Films scored by Yoshihiro Ike
Films shot in Sapporo
Films set in Sapporo
Toei Company films
2010s Japanese films